Dui Noyoner Alo  is a 2005 Bangladeshi romantic drama film directed by Mostafizur Rahman Manik. The film is produced by Humayun Kabir under the banner of Navdhara Films. It stars Shabnur, Ferdous Ahmed, Shakil Khan and Bulbul Ahmed. It revolves around the life struggle of a low-income young woman and her struggle for dignity. The film was released on May 13, 2005. Shabnur won the Bangladesh National Film Award for Best Actress for her performance in it. The film also won two more awards in the music category.

Cast 
 Shabnur - Sejuti
 Ferdous Ahmed - Akash
 Prabir Mitra - Sejuti's father

Soundtrack

Awards and nominations

References

External Links

 

2005 films
2005 drama films
Bengali-language Bangladeshi films
Bangladeshi drama films
2000s Bengali-language films